The Zentralinstitut für Kunstgeschichte (ZI; engl. Central Institute for Art History), is an independent art-historical research institute in Germany. The institute resides in the former administration building of the National Socialist party near Königsplatz in Munich.

About
The institute is supported by the Bavarian State Ministry of Sciences, Research and Art and supervised by an international board of trustees. It defines itself as both a place of academic exchange and a platform for international encounters. It organizes lectures and symposia and edits various art history publications, for instance, the Reallexikon zur Deutschen Kunstgeschichte and the Kunstchronik, an art journal featuring articles on museum matters, important exhibitions and art historical conferences, and the preservation of monuments and historic buildings. The institute also maintains one of the most comprehensive art libraries worldwide with more than 650,000 volumes, 1,200 current periodicals and over 75,000 auction sales catalogues and an extensive collection of photographs of artworks.

After its foundation in 1946, the Zentralinstitut für Kunstgeschichte started its activities in 1947 under its first director Ludwig Heinrich Heydenreich. After his retirement in 1970, Willibald Sauerländer succeeded him as the second director of the ZI. The latter was followed in 1991 by Wolf Tegethoff. In 2015, Ulrich Pfisterer was also appointed director of the institute. Both Tegethoff and Pfisterer were collaborating as the leaders of the ZI until end of 2017. Since 2018 Ulrich Pfisterer is director of the ZI.

The institute is located in a historic building on Königsplatz, Munich (former “Administrative Building of the National Socialist Party”). The Munich Central Collecting Point had been installed in this building in June 1945 by the American Military Government. The mission of this art collecting facility was the restitution to the rightful owners of looted art confiscated by the National Socialist regime all over Europe during World War II.

Further reading 
Iris Lauterbach, Das Zentralinstitut für Kunstgeschichte (Munich, 1997).
Kataloge der Bibliothek des Zentralinstituts für Kunstgeschichte in München: Begleitheft zum Sachkatalog (K.G. Saur, 1985).

References

External links
 Zentralinstitut für Kunstgeschichte (ZI) - Home page
 Christian Fuhrmeister, "Research and Digitized Resources", A New Era of Collaboration and Digitized Resources: World War II Provenance Research Seminar, May 6-7, 2011, United States National Archives

Organizations established in 1946
Research institutes in Munich
1946 establishments in Germany